Monsun (4 March 1990 – 9 September 2012) was a bay Thoroughbred racehorse and stallion bred in Germany by Gestüt Isarland and owned by Baron Georg von Ullmann.

Background
Monsun was a son of Germany's first triple crown winner and champion racehorse and sire, Königsstuhl, a descendant of the influential sire, Bahram. Monsun's dam was Mosella who was sired by Surumu, a multi champion racehorse.

Monsun was a strong, 16.1hh and attractive horse. He was a high-class middle-distance racehorse who was particularly effective on rain-affected surface. His trainer was Heinz Jentzsch.

He was blind later in life. He died after an acute neurological disease at the age of 22 on 9 September 2012.

Races
Monsun was a very tough competitor who ran on both soft and firm ground. He started his career at age three. He won 12 of his 23 races, including three Group 1 races (Aral Pokal) at three years old and Europa Preis at both three and four years old. He also finished second to then less-fancied stable companion Lando in the 1993 Deutsches Derby.

Stud record
Monsun retired in 1996 and began his stud duty at Gestüt Schlenderhan near Cologne. At stud, he proved a revelation and sired several champion colts and fillies. In 2007, the fee for his stud service was €120,000. In 2010, he became one of Europe's four most expensive sires.

Monsun sired a total of 713 foals, 108 of whom are stakes winners, with strike rate of 15%. He was named as leading sire in Germany for four times. His notable sons are Shirocco, 2005 German Horse of the Year and winner of the 2004 Deutsches Derby and 2005 Breeders' Cup Turf, and Manduro who was ranked #1 in the World Thoroughbred Racehorse Rankings for 2007. Other offspring, Stacelita, is the 2011 Eclipse Award winner. One of his early offspring, Samum, was the winner of the 2000 Deutsches Derby. On 20 June 2013, his daughter Estimate (out of Ebaziya) won the Ascot Gold Cup for Queen Elizabeth II. In 2013 his son Fiorente beat an international quality field to win the 3200 metre Melbourne Cup. In 2014, his son Protectionist also won the Melbourne Cup. In 2016 his son Almandin trained by Robert Hickmott also won the Melbourne Cup.

Monsun is also the broodmare sire of Pastorius, a German racehorse who won several G1 races in Germany and France. and Sea The Moon, the 2014 Deutsches Derby winner.

Pedigree

References

1990 racehorse births
2012 racehorse deaths
Racehorses bred in Germany
Racehorses trained in Germany
Thoroughbred family 8-a
Chefs-de-Race